Scelodonta (or Heteraspis) is a genus of leaf beetles in the subfamily Eumolpinae. The genus includes over 70 species, mainly from the Afrotropical, Palearctic and Oriental biogeographic realms. Only three species are found in Australia.

According to recent literature, the name Scelodonta Westwood, 1838 is actually a junior synonym of Heteraspis Chevrolat in Dejean, 1836. As the conditions for reversal of precedence in the International Code of Zoological Nomenclature are not met, Heteraspis should be used as the valid name for the genus.

Species
Select species include:

 Scelodonta aeneola Lefèvre, 1885
 Scelodonta albidovittata Baly, 1877
 Scelodonta albidovittata albidovittata Baly, 1877
 Scelodonta albidovittata ruandensis Burgeon, 1941
 Scelodonta albomaculata Pic, 1939
 Scelodonta albopectoralis Pic, 1943
 Scelodonta alternata Jacoby, 1908
 Scelodonta areolata Lefèvre, 1891
 Scelodonta aurosignata Lefèvre, 1883
 Scelodonta bella Pic, 1937
 Scelodonta bidentata Baly, 1877
 Scelodonta brevipilis Lea, 1915
 Scelodonta carinata Bryant, 1956
 Scelodonta celebensis Jacoby, 1894
 Scelodonta chapuisi Lefèvre, 1884
 Scelodonta congoana Weise, 1915
 Scelodonta corrugata Lefèvre, 1885
 Scelodonta costata Jacoby, 1894
 Scelodonta costatipennis Pic, 1956
 Scelodonta cuprea Bryant, 1935
 Scelodonta curculionoides Westwood, 1838
 Scelodonta cyanea Lefèvre, 1877
 Scelodonta dillwyni (Stephens, 1831)
 Scelodonta dispar Lefèvre, 1885
 Scelodonta diversecostata Pic, 1941
 Scelodonta gowdeyi Bryant, 1935
 Scelodonta granulosa Baly, 1867
 Scelodonta humeralis Pic, 1956
 Scelodonta immaculata Jacoby, 1908
 Scelodonta impressipennis Lefèvre, 1877
 Scelodonta inaequalis Fairmaire, 1887
 Scelodonta iriana Medvedev, 2009
 Scelodonta kibonotensis Weise, 1910
 Scelodonta laeviuscula Heller, 1898
 Scelodonta lefevrei Jacoby, 1904
 Scelodonta lewisii Baly, 1874
 Scelodonta lineaticollis Pic, 1950
 Scelodonta longicollis Jacoby, 1908
 Scelodonta maculicollis Burgeon, 1941
 Scelodonta maculosa Lefèvre, 1891
 Scelodonta madoni Pic, 1949
 Scelodonta monardi Pic, 1939
 Scelodonta murrayi Baly, 1865
 Scelodonta natalensis Baly, 1878
 Scelodonta nilgiriensis Jacoby, 1908
 Scelodonta palmerstoni Blackburn, 1889
 Scelodonta parcepilosa Burgeon, 1941
 Scelodonta pectoralis Jacoby, 1898
 Scelodonta pulchella Baly, 1864
 Scleodonta pulchra Schaufuss, 1885
 Scelodonta purpurea Papp, 1951
 Scelodonta purpureomaculata Baly, 1864
 Scelodonta quadrifossulata Burgeon, 1941
 Scelodonta raffrayi Lefèvre, 1877
 Scelodonta rugipennis Jacoby, 1904
 Scelodonta sansibarica Gerstaecker, 1871
 Scelodonta sauteri Chûjô, 1938
 Scelodonta sexplagiata Jacoby, 1900
 Scelodonta simoni Baly, 1878
 Scelodonta spinipes Pic, 1937
 Scelodonta strigata Lefèvre, 1877
 Scelodonta subcostata Jacoby, 1908
 Scelodonta subglabra Gridelli, 1939
 Scelodonta superba Pic, 1937
 Scelodonta theresae Pic, 1956
 Scelodonta trinotata Pic, 1939
 Scelodonta turneri Bryant, 1952
 Scelodonta vicina Harold, 1877
 Scelodonta vietnamica Eroshkina, 1988
 Scelodonta viridimaculata Jacoby, 1877
 Scelodonta viridula Lefèvre, 1875
 Scelodonta vitis Bryant, 1931
 Scelodonta vitivora Bryant, 1935
 Scelodonta vitticollis Weise, 1906
 Scelodonta vittata (Olivier, 1808)
 Scelodonta wittei Burgeon, 1942

Synonyms:
 Scelodonta aenea (Motschulsky, 1866): synonym of Pagria restituens (Walker, 1859)
 Scelodonta egregia Lefèvre, 1877: synonym of Scelodonta bidentata Baly, 1877
 Scelodonta indica Duvivier, 1891: synonym of Scelodonta dillwyni (Stephens, 1831)
 Scelodonta orientalis Lefèvre, 1877: synonym of Scelodonta lewisii Baly, 1874
 Scelodonta strigicollis (Motschulsky, 1866): synonym of Scelodonta dillwyni (Stephens, 1831)

References

Eumolpinae
Chrysomelidae genera
Beetles of Asia
Beetles of Africa
Beetles of Australia
Taxa named by John O. Westwood